Barry Stanton (born 17 February 1940) is a British stage, film and television actor.

Selected filmography

Film
 Robbery (1967)
 King Lear (1971)
 Demons of the Mind (1972)
 Hamlet (1977)
 Sweeney 2 (1977)
 Lionheart (1987)
 King of the Wind (1990)
 Robin Hood (1991)
 Shanghai Knights (2003)

Television
 The Plane Makers (1963)
 Front Page Story (1965)
 The Baron (1966)
 The Likely Lads (1966)
 Witch Hunt (1967)
 No Hiding Place (1967)
 George and the Dragon (1968)
 Spy Trap (1972)
 Budgie (1972)
 The Sweeney (1975)
 Upstairs, Downstairs (1975)
 The New Avengers (1977)
 Fallen Hero (1978-1979)
 Turtle's Progress (1979-1980)
 The Search for Alexander the Great (1981)
 Something in Disguise (1982)
 Minder (1982)
 Now and Then (1983)
 Doctor Who (1984)
 Tucker's Luck (1984)
 Mann's Best Friends (1985)
 Yes, Prime Minister (1986)
 Ain't Misbehavin' (1995)
 Dalziel and Pascoe (1998)
 The Infinite Worlds of H. G. Wells (2001)

References

Bibliography 
 George W. Brand. British Television Drama in the 1980s. Cambridge University Press, 1993.

External links 
 
 

1940 births
Living people
British male television actors
British male film actors
Male actors from Manchester